Theja High School is a school located in Karimnagar, Telangana, India. Established in 1990 by Theja Educational Society, the school is co-educational and secular, half a kilometer away from the District Court in Karimnagar. Founded by Mr. Mechineni Devendar Rao, the school has a campus comprising two buildings with independent facilities for each.

The school offers education in Telugu and English. The school is affiliated to the council of Secondary School Certification Examinations (SSC).

References

Educational institutions established in 1990
High schools and secondary schools in Telangana
Karimnagar district
1990 establishments in Andhra Pradesh